The 1986 Pacific Tigers football team represented the University of the Pacific (UOP) in the 1986 NCAA Division I-A football season as a member of the Pacific Coast Athletic Association.

The team was led by head coach Bob Cope, in his fourth year, and played their home games at Pacific Memorial Stadium in Stockton, California. They finished the season with a record of four wins and seven losses (4–7, 2–5 PCAA). The Tigers were outscored by their opponents 174–252 over the season.

Schedule

Team players in the NFL
The following UOP players were selected in the 1987 NFL Draft.

Notes

References

Pacific
Pacific Tigers football seasons
Pacific Tigers football